Motovylivka is a Ukrainian village, located in Fastiv Raion of Kyiv Oblast. It belongs to Fastiv urban hromada, one of the hromadas of Ukraine.

In 2001 its population  was 3,499. Its area covered .

History 

Motovylivka is an ancient Ukrainian village founded between 1712-1714, when the terms of the Treaty of the Pruth (1711) forced Ukrainian Cossacks from Great Motovylivka (subjects of Моsкоia) to move to the left bank of the Stuhna.

On 18 November 1918, the Battle of Motovylivka was fought around the railway station. 

The name Chervona Motovylivka was established in 1940. Previous names were Chernecha Motovylivka, Kazenna Motovylivka and Kamenevo.

In April 1917 one of the first sections of Prosvita society in Fastivschyna was founded.

Notables 

Valery Pyatnitsky (born 1962) - Ukrainian politician and statesman. Government's Commissioner for European Integration.

References

External links 
Chervona Motovylivka on website of Verkhovna Rada of Ukraine

Villages in Fastiv Raion